Perdix is a genus of Galliform gamebirds known collectively as the 'true partridges'. These birds are unrelated to the subtropical species that have been named after the partridge due to similar size and morphology.

Taxonomy
The genus Perdix was introduced by the French zoologist Mathurin Jacques Brisson in 1760 with the grey partridge (Perdix perdix) as the type species. The genus name is Latin for "partridge", which is itself derived from  Ancient Greek ‘πέρδιξ’ (pérdīx).  They are closely related to grouse, koklass, quail and pheasants.

This genus contains three extant species:

Some prehistoric species have been identified:

 Perdix margaritae Kurochkin, 1985
 Perdix palaeoperdix Mourer-Chauviré, 1975

A prehistoric species only known from fossils was described as Perdix palaeoperdix. Occurring all over southern Europe during the Early–Late Pleistocene, it was a favorite food of the Cro-Magnons and Neanderthals. The relationships between the prehistoric species and the grey partridge are somewhat obscure; while very similar, they might be better understood as sister species rather than the grey partridge evolving from the Pleistocene taxon.

Description
These are medium-sized partridges with dull-coloured bills and legs, streaked brown upperparts, and rufous tails with barring on the flanks. Neither sex has spurs on the legs, and the only plumage distinction is that females tend to be duller in appearance. Grey and Daurian partridges are very closely related and similar in appearance, and form a superspecies. Tibetan partridge has a striking black and white face pattern, black breast barring and 16 tail feathers instead of the 18 of the other species.

Distribution
There are representatives of Perdix in most of temperate Europe and Asia. One member of the genus, the grey partridge, has been introduced to the United States and Canada for the purpose of hunting. These are non-migratory birds of the steppes and similar open country, though nowadays they are more associated with agricultural land. The nest is a lined ground scrape in or near cover. They feed on a wide variety of seeds and some insect food.

Cultural references 
The bird shares its name with the nephew of Daedalus of Greek mythology, who was transformed into the bird when his uncle murdered him in jealousy.  He was killed when thrown headlong down from the sacred hill of Minerva, so,  mindful of his fall, the bird does not build its nest in the trees, nor take lofty flights and  avoids high places.

Status
None of the species is threatened on a global scale, but the two more widespread partridges are over-hunted in parts of their range. The grey partridge has been badly affected by agricultural changes, and its range has contracted considerably. The Tibetan partridge seems secure in its extensive and often inaccessible range on the Tibetan plateau.

References

Further reading

 Madge, Steve; McGowan, Philip J. K. & Kirwan, Guy M. (2002): Pheasants, partridges and grouse : a guide to the pheasants, partridges, quails, grouse, guineafowl, buttonquails and sandgrouse of the world. Christopher Helm, London. 

 
Bird genera
Game birds